Adolf von Boog (27 April 1866, Belluno — 15 February 1929, Vienna) was an Austro-Hungarian Army officer who served in World War I, holding senior positions in the General Staff and commanding field units, and later was briefly the commander-in-chief of the Volkswehr ("People's Defense") of the new postwar rump state of Austria.

Biography
Adolf von Boog was born in the city of Belluno in 1866, formerly a possession of the Austrian Empire before it became part of the unified Kingdom of Italy. He spoke fluent German and Italian, along with some Bohemian, Hungarian, and Bosnian. Boog was commissioned as a lieutenant in a heavy artillery battery of the Austro-Hungarian Army in 1886. In 1892, Boog was appointed to the General Staff, where he remained until 1900. He then served in the 31st Infantry Regiment to 1901 before becoming part of the General Staff again, then serving in the 88th Infantry Regiment from 1907 until 1909. Boog became the chief of staff of XV Corps to 1910. In the period from then until 1911, he commanded an infantry regiment before returning to a senior staff position and then going to the War Ministry.

By the time World War I broke out in August 1914, Adolf von Boog was a colonel in command of the 8th Infantry Brigade. He served on the Eastern Front until being appointed as the chief of staff of 3rd Army in September 1914, a post he held until May 1915. Boog then commanded the 93rd Infantry Division on the Italian Front before returning to the east to lead the 25th Infantry Division in September. He would command that unit until May 1918, at which point he briefly served as the commander of the 4th Infantry Division towards the end of the war.

On 7 November 1918, Lieutenant field marshal Adolf von Boog was named supreme commander of the Austrian Volkswehr (People's Defense), the military of the Austrian state after the collapse of the Dual Monarchy. He would retire from that position in 1919 and died in Vienna on 15 February 1929.

Sources

Notes

Books
 

1866 births
1929 deaths
Austrian lieutenant field marshals
Austrian military personnel
Austrian monarchists
Austrian nobility
Austro-Hungarian military personnel of World War I
Austro-Hungarian generals
People from Belluno